Bad Windsheim (East Franconian: Winsa) is a small historic town in Bavaria, Germany with a population of almost 12,000. It lies in the district Neustadt an der Aisch-Bad Windsheim, west of Nuremberg. In the Holy Roman Empire, Windsheim held the rank of Imperial City (until 1802). Since 1810 Windsheim is part of Bavaria. In 1961, it became a spa town and has since been called "Bad Windsheim".

Climate
The climate in this area shows only small differences between highs and lows, and there is adequate rainfall year-round. The Köppen Climate Classification subtype for this climate is "Cfb" (Marine West Coast Climate/Oceanic climate).

History
A document from 741 proves for the first time the existence of the town, then called Uuinidesheim. The name changed to "Windsheim" by linguistic development, meaning "the home of the wind".

In the late stage of World War II, a Volkssturm battalion took control of the town and refused to surrender to the approaching American troops, declaring Windsheim a "fortress". American troops eventually captured the town after deploying fire bombs through aerial bombing. The civilian population was forced to flee from Windsheim under enemy fire. The town was rebuilt after the war.

Attractions
The town is known for its waters and spa, Franken-Therme, and an open-air museum, the Freilandmuseum, which brings together old farms and farmhouses from the area. On the first weekend in August every year Bad Windsheim is the location for an event called Weinturm Open Air, a concert on the top of a hill in the town. The town also features a war memorial in the form of a large statue of Roland.

Notable people

Sons and daughters of the town 
 Georg Wilhelm Steller (1709–1746), physician and scientist who participated in the Great Northern Expedition
 Johann Christoph Döderlein (1745–1792), theologian
 Otto Strasser (1897–1974), politician, brother of Gregor Strasser
 Erich Mühe (1938–2005), surgeon, founder of micro-invasive surgery in 1985
 Nevio Passaro (born 1980), German-Italian singer and songwriter
 Vyncint Smith (born 1996), American Football Wide Receiver in the National Football League (NFL)

Personalities who worked locally 
 Francis Daniel Pastorius (1651–1719), German lawyer and writers, he is considered to be the founder of the first German settlement in North America.

References

External links

 Bad Windsheim official website 
 Weinturm Open Air official website 
 Fränkisches Freilandmuseum official website 
 Frankentherme Bad Windsheim official website 

1802 disestablishments
States and territories established in 1248
Neustadt (Aisch)-Bad Windsheim
Franconian Circle
Spa towns in Germany